Jairo Israel Araújo Cano (born February 25, 1990, in San Francisco del Rincón, Guanajuato) is a Mexican footballer. He currently plays  for Cimarrones de Sonora of Mexico.

External links
 
 Jairo Araujo at playmakerstats.com (English version of ceroacero.es)

1990 births
Living people
Mexican footballers
Association football midfielders
Club León footballers
Alianza F.C. footballers
Cimarrones de Sonora players
Ascenso MX players
Liga Premier de México players
Tercera División de México players
Mexican expatriate footballers
Mexican expatriate sportspeople in El Salvador
Expatriate footballers in El Salvador
Footballers from Guanajuato
People from San Francisco del Rincón